Amitava Bhattacharjee is a theoretical plasma physicist and a professor at Princeton University. He was awarded the 2022 James Clerk Maxwell Prize for Plasma Physics for his work on dusty plasmas and fundamental plasma processes such as magnetic reconnection, magnetohydrodynamic turbulence and dynamo actions, as well as his contributions in connecting laboratory plasmas to astrophysical plasmas.

References 

Living people
Year of birth missing (living people)
Fellows of the American Physical Society

 University of Michigan alumni